"Tie Your Dream to Mine" is a song recorded by American country music artist Marty Robbins.  It was released in October 1982 as the second single from the album Come Back to Me.  The song reached #24 on the Billboard Hot Country Singles & Tracks chart.  The song was written by Van Stephenson, Tim DuBois, Jeff Silbar and Sam Lorber.

Chart performance

References

1982 singles
1982 songs
Marty Robbins songs
Songs written by Tim DuBois
Songs written by Sam Lorber
Songs written by Jeff Silbar
Songs written by Van Stephenson
Song recordings produced by Bob Montgomery (songwriter)
Columbia Records singles